Gamkapoort Dam is a gravity type dam located on the Gamka River, near Prince Albert, Western Cape, South Africa. It was established in 1969 and its primary purpose is for flood control.

See also
List of reservoirs and dams in South Africa
List of rivers of South Africa

References 

 List of South African Dams from the Department of Water Affairs and Forestry (South Africa)

Dams in South Africa
Dams completed in 1969